This was the first edition of the tournament.
Chan Hao-ching and Chan Yung-jan won the title, defeating Eri Hozumi and Miyu Kato in the final, 6–4, 6–3.

Seeds

Draw

References 
 Main Draw

Taiwan Open
WTA Taiwan Open